Basargino is a rural locality (a settlement) in Proletarsky Selsoviet, Altaysky District, Altai Krai, Russia. The population was 1 as of 2013. There are 4 streets.

Geography 
Basargino is located 31 km south of Altayskoye (the district's administrative centre) by road. Komar is the nearest rural locality.

References 

Rural localities in Altaysky District, Altai Krai